The Padma Bhushan is the third-highest civilian award of the Republic of India. Instituted on 2January 1954, the award is given for "distinguished service of a high order", without distinction of race, occupation, position, or sex. The recipients receive a Sanad, a certificate signed by the President of India and a circular-shaped medallion with no monetary association. The recipients are announced every year on Republic Day (26January) and registered in The Gazette of Indiaa publication used for official government notices and released weekly by the Department of Publication, under the Ministry of Urban Development. The conferral of the award is not considered official without its publication in the Gazette. The name of recipient, whose award have been revoked or restored, both of which require the authority of the President, is  archived and they are required to surrender their medal when their name is struck from the register; none of the conferments of Padma Bhushan during 1954–1959 have been revoked or restored. The recommendations are received from all the state and the union territory governments, as well as from Ministries of the Government of India, the Bharat Ratna and the Padma Vibhushan awardees, the Institutes of Excellence, the Ministers, the Chief Ministers and the Governors of State, and the Members of Parliament including private individuals.

When instituted in 1954, the Padma Bhushan was classified as "Dusra Varg" (Class II) under the three-tier Padma Vibhushan awards, which were preceded by the Bharat Ratna in hierarchy. The original specification of the award was a circle made of standard silver  in diameter, with rims on both the sides. A centrally located lotus flower was embossed on the obverse side of the medal and the text "Padma Vibhushan" written in Devanagari script was inscribed above the lotus along the upper edge of the medal. A floral wreath was embossed along the lower edge and a lotus wreath at the top along the upper edge. The State Emblem of India was placed in the centre of the reverse side with the text "Desh Seva" in Devanagari Script on the lower edge. The medal was suspended by a pink riband  in width divided into three equal segments by two white vertical lines.

On 15January 1955, the Padma Vibhushan was reclassified into three different awards; the Padma Vibhushan, the highest of the three, followed by the Padma Bhushan and the Padma Shri. The criteria includes "distinguished service of a high order in any field including service rendered by Government servants" but excluding those working with the Public sector undertakings with the exception of doctors and scientists. The 1954 statutes did not allow posthumous awards but this was subsequently modified in the January 1955 statute. The design was also modified to the form that is currently in use. The centrally placed pattern made of outer lines of a square of  side is embossed with a knob embossed within each of the outer angles of the pattern. A raised circular space of diameter  is placed at the centre of the decoration. A centrally located lotus flower is embossed on the obverse side of the medal and the text "Padma" written in Devanagari script is placed above and the text "Bhushan" is placed below the lotus. The Emblem of India is placed in the centre of the reverse side with the national motto of India, "Satyameva Jayate" (Truth alone triumphs) in Devanagari Script, inscribed on the lower edge. The rim, the edges and all embossing on either side is of standard gold with the text "Padma Bhushan" of gold gilt. The medal is suspended by a pink riband  in width with a broad white stripe in the middle. It is ranked fifth in the order of precedence of wearing of medals and decorations of the Indian civilian and military awards.

A total of twenty-three awards were conferred in 1954 followed by twelve in 1955; thirteen in 1956; sixteen in 1957; sixteen again in 1958, and fourteen in 1959, giving a total of 94 recipients in the first six years—including one foreign recipient awarded in 1955. Till 1959, individuals from nine different fields were awarded which includes twenty-six from literature and education, seventeen from civil service, twelve artists, ten from science and engineering, ten from social work, eight from public affairs, six from medicine, four sportspersons, and one from trade and industry.

Recipients

Explanatory notes

References

External links 
 
 

Lists of Indian award winners
1950s in India
1950s-related lists